The Altair Campground Community Kitchen, also known as Altaire Campground Community Kitchen, was built in Olympic National Park, Washington, United States, to serve the Altair Campground. It is an open rectangular shelter built in 1935 by the Civilian Conservation Corps personnel from the Elwha River Camp in the National Park Service Rustic style.

Located near the Elwha River, the peeled log structure is capped with a cedar shake roof, enclosing a cooking fireplace and chimney. The lower portions of the log columns have been replaced with concrete piers due to deterioration, and the original peeled log railings have disappeared.

The Altair and Elwha Campground Community Kitchens are the only such structures remaining in Olympic National Park. The Altair campground was named after the USS Altair, whose crew regularly used the site in the 1920s and 1930s. The kitchen structure was listed on National Register of Historic Places on July 13, 2007.

By 2014 the Elwha Dam and all other dams along the Elwha River were removed. When the river flooded in November 2015, both Altair and Elwha Campgrounds were severely damaged by water. National Park Service has no plans to restore the two campgrounds. The actual state of buildings in the two areas is not clear.

See also
 Elwha Ranger Station nearby

References

Park buildings and structures on the National Register of Historic Places in Washington (state)
Government buildings completed in 1935
Buildings and structures in Clallam County, Washington
National Register of Historic Places in Olympic National Park
National Park Service rustic in Washington (state)
Civilian Conservation Corps in Washington (state)
National Register of Historic Places in Clallam County, Washington
Campgrounds in Washington (state)
1935 establishments in Washington (state)